ORMA 60 is a class of sailing trimarans administered by the Ocean Racing Multihull Association (ORMA) that created in 1996 by the International Sailing Federation (ISAF) within the sport of sailing. The boats were built to a box rule that permitted 60 feet length and beam and a 100-foot mast. 

The class was active from 1996 to 2007.  The boats built to the class rule were some of the fastest ocean going sailboats ever built, but suffered many failures at sea, including capsize. In one famous race, 2002 Route du Rhum, only 3 of 18 starters managed to complete the race.   This eventually led to the abandonment of the class by sponsors. As a result, it is no longer actively managed by the ISAF. The one design Mod70 was created to continue the heritage of large blue water racing multihulls, while addressing the issues that had arisen with the ORMA 60 designs.    

Several ORMA 60 boats continue to compete in handicap races. The 'first to finish' winner of the 2017 Transpac race was the ORMA 60 class boat Mighty Merloe, which set a new course record of 4 days, 7:03:30, beating the previous record by almost a full day. 

Several high-profile yacht races cater to these classes, such as the Route du Rhum, the Transat Jacques Vabre, the Quebec-St Malo and the Single-Handed Trans-Atlantic Race.

Winners of ORMA Championship
2007 : Franck Cammas on Groupama 2
2006 : Franck Cammas on Groupama 2
2005 : Pascal Bidégorry on Banque Populaire
2004 : Franck Cammas on Groupama 2
2003 : Franck Cammas on Groupama
2002 : Loïck Peyron on Fujifilm
2001 : Franck Cammas on Groupama
2000 : Franck Cammas on Groupama
1999 : Loïck Peyron on Fujicolor II
1998 : Laurent Bourgnon on Primagaz
1997 : Loïck Peyron on Fujicolor II
1996 : Loïck Peyron on Fujicolor II

See also
 IMOCA 60
 Open 50

References

External links

 ISAF Official website

Multihulls
Former classes of World Sailing